This is a list of people from Spokane, Washington. The list includes individuals who were born in or lived in the city. A person who lives in or comes from Spokane, Washington, is known as a Spokanite.

Authors 
 Sherman Alexie, author
 David Eddings, author of The Belgariad and many other books
 Wilbur Crane Eveland, served in various functions as secret agent for the USA in the Arab East
 Michael Gurian, New York Times bestselling author of thirty-two books published in twenty-two languages
 Quail Hawkins, bookseller and children's author
 Bruce Holbert, author, Washington State Book Award winner
 Kenn Nesbitt, Children's Poet Laureate (2013–2015) 
 Jack Nisbet, author of several books on explorer David Thompson
 Shann Ray, author, American Book Award winner
 Rick Rydell, outdoor writer, worked at local radio stations as a radio talk show host
 David Shannon, author of No, David! and many other children's books
 Wayne Spitzer, author and low-budget horror filmmaker
 Terry Trueman, Printz Award winning author of Stuck in Neutral and numerous other young adult novels
 Shawn Vestal, author, Washington State Book Award winner and recipient of the PEN/Robert W. Bingham Prize
 Jess Walter, author, recipient of the 2006 Edgar Allan Poe Award

Chefs and restaurateurs 

 Sarah Minnick, chef owner at Lovely Hula Hands and Lovely's Fifty Fifty

Comedians 
 Julia Sweeney, actor and comedian (appeared on Saturday Night Live)
Tom McTigue, actor and comedian, Baywatch, Quantum Leap, Boyhood

Convicted criminals 
 Kevin Coe, convicted "South Hill rapist"
 Jack Owen Spillman, serial killer
 Rollen Stewart, kidnapper
 Robert Lee Yates, serial killer

Film, stage and television industry 
 Sophia Anne Caruso, Broadway actress best known for playing Lydia Deetz in Beetlejuice: The Musical
 Gary Frank, Emmy award-winning actor, known for playing Willie in the ABC series Family.
 Russell Hodgkinson, actor
 Jim Ignatowski, The Reverend Jim "Iggy" Ignatowski, played by Christopher Lloyd, is a fictional character in the 1970s television series Taxi.
 Cheyenne Jackson, singer and actor, known for United 93
 Paul Johansson, actor, appeared in One Tree Hill
 Eric Johnston, former head of the United States Chamber of Commerce, former president of the Motion Picture Association of America
 Chuck Jones, director of animated films, three-time Academy Award winner
 Neil LaBute, film director/playwright
 David Lynch, film director, known for Blue Velvet and Twin Peaks
 Darren McGavin, actor, known for starring in Kolchak: the Night Stalker and A Christmas Story
 John McIntire, actor on Wagon Train and The Virginian
 Michele Morrow, actress, appeared in Basement Jack, The Young and the Restless, and Alias
 Craig T. Nelson, actor, star of television series Coach and Parenthood, as well as the films The Incredibles and Poltergeist
 Seena Owen, silent-film actress
 Gale Page, actress, starred in Knute Rockne, All American with Ronald Reagan
 Patrick Page, Tony-nominated actor best known as Hades in Hadestown
 Susan Peters, actress
 Matt Piedmont, film director and writer
 Trevor St. John, actor; known for his role on One Life to Live (graduated from Whitworth University)
 Wayne Spitzer, low-budget horror filmmaker
 Hilary Swank, two-time Oscar-winning actress (father was stationed at Fairchild Air Force Base)
 Sydney Sweeney, actress; best known for her role as Cassie Howard in Euphoria
 Tongolele, film and television actor
 Sarah Truax, stage and film actress, Spokane resident from 1912 to 1927
 Mary Ann Wilson, American Nurse and TV Fitness Instructor
 Michael Winslow, actor and comedian, known for Police Academy
 Deanna Oliver, actress and writer, known for her role in The Brave Little Toaster and work with Animaniacs and Casper movie

Artists 
 Harold Balazs, sculptor
 Dominic Arizona Bonuccelli, photographer/traveller
 Kenneth Callahan, painter from the Northwest School
 Brian Crane, cartoonist
 Jerry Holkins, writer for Penny Arcade
 Mike Krahulik, artist for Penny Arcade
 Tom Kundig, principal at Olson Kundig Architects
 George Nakashima, furniture maker, entrepreneur
 Clyfford Still, abstract-expressionist painter

Journalists 
 Timothy Egan, journalist, winner of the National Book Award and the Washington State Book Award
 Neil Everett, journalist, ESPN SportsCenter anchor
 Julian Guthrie, journalist and author based in San Francisco 
 Sue Herera, journalist, CNBC anchor
 Eric Johnson, journalist, former sports director for KREM 2; weeknight news anchor for KOMO 4
 John Richards, journalist, radio personality, producer of The Morning Show and Audioasis on 90.3 FM KEXP Seattle
 Rick Rydell, journalist, worked at local radio stations KJRB, KZZU, and KKZX as a radio talk show host

Musicians 
 Jim Boyd, musician
 Cami Bradley, America's Got Talent finalist and member of The Sweeplings
 Keeley Brineman, musician and lead singer with Lord Mouse and the Kalypso Katz
 Mike Clarke, member of the band The Byrds
 Bing Crosby, singer/actor
 Bob Crosby, bandleader and vocalist
 Andra Day, singer-songwriter
 Paul D'Amour, former member of the band Tool
 Andy Gibson, singer-songwriter
 Theo Hakola
 Dan Hamilton, member of Surf band The Ventures, Hamilton, Joe Frank & Reynolds, and The T-Bones.
 Thomas Hampson, baritone
 Dan Hoerner, lead guitarist and backup vocalist for the band Sunny Day Real Estate
 Myles Kennedy, lead singer of the band Alter Bridge
 Keyboard Cat and his handler Charlie Schmidt, performer on a viral internet meme
 Ryan Lewis, music producer; primarily with Macklemore
 George Lynch, former member of the rock band Dokken; member of Lynch Mob
 Chad Mitchell, member of the Chad Mitchell Trio
 Craig Montoya, former member of the band Everclear
 Matty Mullins, lead singer of the band Memphis May Fire
 Patrice Munsel, former Metropolitan Opera star
 Danny O'Keefe, singer-songwriter
 Eckart Preu, conductor of the Spokane Symphony Orchestra
 Jimmy Rowles, jazz pianist
 Scott Thompson, former member of the Canadian band Lillix
 Billy Tipton, jazz musician
 Kenny "Blues Boss" Wayne, boogie-woogie and blues-rock pianist
 Tyrone Wells, singer-songwriter
 Merrill Womach, undertaker, organist and gospel singer, founder of National Music Service
Charlie Butts - saxophone player, frontman of Charlie Butts and The Filter Tips
GrandMixer GMS - DJ/remixer for Tairrie B

Politicians 
Civic
 James Everett Chase, mayor of Spokane
 Jack Geraghty, mayor of Spokane; former Spokane County Commissioner 
 Dennis P. Hession, mayor of Spokane
 John Powers, mayor of Spokane
 David H. Rodgers, mayor of Spokane
 Ron Sims, former member of the King County Council; former King County Executive; former member of the United States Department of Housing and Urban Development
 Jon Snyder, member of the Spokane City Council
 John Talbott, mayor of Spokane
 Mary Verner, mayor of Spokane
 James E. West, Washington State Senator and Spokane mayor

Federal

 Ryan Crocker, U.S. diplomat, former U.S. Ambassador to Iraq
 Tom Foley, U.S. Congressman, former Democratic Speaker of the United States House of Representatives, Former US Ambassador to Japan
 Eric Johnston, former head of the United States Chamber of Commerce, former president of the Motion Picture Association of America
 Mike McKevitt, U.S. Congressman for Colorado's 1st District in the United States House of Representatives (1971–73)
 George Nethercutt, former Republican U.S. Congressman, judge and attorney
 Ron Sims, former Deputy Secretary of the U.S. Department of Housing and Urban Development

State
 Andy Billig, Washington State Senator
 James M. Geraghty, Washington State Supreme Court Justice
 Samuel G. Havermale, early Spokane pioneer, minister and politician
 Horace E. Houghton, Washington and Wisconsin state legislator, lawyer
 James E. West, Washington State Senator and Spokane mayor
 Marcus Riccelli, Washington State Representative

Science and technology 
 Michael P. Anderson, astronaut killed in the 2003 Space Shuttle Columbia disaster
 Walter Houser Brattain, awarded the 1956 Nobel Prize in Physics
 Robert Dirks, computational chemist killed in a 2015 train wreck in New York 
 Dorothy M. Horstmann, virologist, made important discoveries about polio
 Anne McClain, NASA Astronaut, Flight Engineer for Expedition 58/59 to the International Space Station
 Wilder Graves Penfield, American-born Canadian neurosurgeon who mapped out the functional areas of the cerebral cortex and pioneered groundbreaking research into epilepsy treatment
 Irwin Rose, biologist awarded the 2004 Nobel Prize in Chemistry

Sports 
Auto racing
 Chad Little, NASCAR race winner
 Tom Sneva, Indianapolis 500 winner and IndyCar Series champion

Baseball
 Jeremy Affeldt, Major League Baseball (MLB) pitcher for the San Francisco Giants
 Ed Brandt, MLB pitcher (1928–38)
 Ed Kirkpatrick, former MLB outfielder and catcher
 Andrew Kittredge, pitcher for Tampa Bay Rays
 Larry Koentopp, Gonzaga University three-sport all-state selection, baseball head coach and athletic director
 Tyler Olson, pitcher for Cleveland Indians
 Mike Redmond, former MLB player for the Florida Marlins, Minnesota Twins, and Cleveland Indians; manager for the Marlins; (Gonzaga University graduate, 1993)
 Ryne Sandberg, 2005 inductee in the Baseball Hall of Fame, former second baseman for the Chicago Cubs, former MLB manager for the Philadelphia Phillies
 Kevin Stocker, former shortstop for the Philadelphia Phillies, Tampa Bay Devil Rays and Anaheim Angels; current analyst for the Pac-12 Network
 Christine Wren, second female professional baseball umpire

Basketball
 Briann January, former Arizona State Sun Devils player; plays for the WNBA's Indiana Fever (Lewis and Clark High School graduate, 2005)
 Adam Morrison, former Gonzaga player, former 2005–2006 first-team All-American, Charlotte Bobcats and Los Angeles Lakers basketball player (Mead High School graduate, 2003)
 John Stockton, NBA Hall of Fame former point guard for the Utah Jazz
 Wayne Tinkle, player for the Montana Grizzlies (Ferris High School graduate, 1984); currently head coach for the Oregon State Beavers

Billiards
 Dorothy Wise, member of Billiard Congress of America Hall of Fame

Boxing
Chauncy Welliver, professional boxer

Hockey
 Patrick Dwyer, Spokane native who last played for the NHL's Carolina Hurricanes
 Tyler Johnson, former Spokane Chiefs player and back-to-back Stanley Cup winner with the Tampa Bay Lightning
 Derek Ryan, Spokane native currently playing for NHL's Edmonton Oilers
 Kailer Yamamoto, Spokane native currently playing for NHL's Edmonton Oilers

Extreme sports
 Jess Roskelley, youngest American (at the time) to climb Mount Everest
 Eric Uptagrafft, sport shooter

Football
 Bob Bellinger, football player
 Erik Coleman, former Washington State Cougars football player, former player for the Atlanta Falcons and Detroit Lions (Lewis and Clark High School graduate, 2000)
 Joe Danelo, former kicker for the Green Bay Packers, the New York Giants, and the Buffalo Bills (graduated from WSU and Gonzaga Prep 1971)
 Will Davis, former defensive back for the Miami Dolphins, Baltimore Ravens, San Francisco 49ers, and Salt Lake Stallions of the AAF
 Steve Emtman, 1992 NFL No. 1 draft pick, former defensive lineman for the Indianapolis Colts
 Steve Gleason, NFL former special teams player for the New Orleans Saints and a graduate of WSU and Gonzaga Prep.
 Jason Hanson, former kicker with the Detroit Lions
 Max Krause, running back for the New York Giants and Washington Redskins
 Dan Lynch, first team All-American for Washington State University (Lewis & Clark High School graduate 1980)
 Steve Parker, former NFL defensive end for the New Orleans Saints
 Mark Rypien, former quarterback for the Washington Redskins; Most Valuable Player of 1991 Super Bowl; Shadle Park High School, Washington State University 
 Bishop Sankey, former NFL running back for the Tennessee Titans  (attended Gonzaga Preparatory School)
 Cory Withrow, former NFL center for the St. Louis Rams
 John Yarno, former NFL offensive lineman (attended Gonzaga Preparatory School and Ferris High School)

Mixed martial arts
 Michael Chiesa, Ultimate Fighter winner and current UFC lightweight
 Julianna Peña, Ultimate Fighter winner and current UFC women's bantamweight champion
 Sam Sicilia, Ultimate Fighter alumnus and former UFC featherweight
Brady Hiestand, Ultimate Fighter finalist and current UFC bantamweight

Rowing
 Joe Rantz, 1936 Summer Olympics gold medal winner in the eights competition

Soccer
 Amy LePeilbet, professional player for Boston Breakers; vice world champion

Tennis
 Jan-Michael Gambill, professional player

Track and field
 Madonna Buder, 75-year-old Catholic nun and oldest Hawaii Ironman Triathlete competitor
 Helga Estby, walked across the United States in 1896
 Fortune Gordien, Olympic silver and bronze medalist in discus throw
 Gerry Lindgren, runner, won 11 NCAA championships at Washington State University (attended John R. Rogers High School) 
 Brad Walker, American record holder and two-time world champion in the pole vault (University High School graduate)

Early Spokane notable residents 
 Joe Albi, attorney and civic leader
 Kirtland Cutter, architect, known for his work in Spokane, including the Davenport Hotel
 Sonora Smart Dodd, successfully campaigned for the establishment of Father's Day
 Helga Estby, Norwegian-American resident of the Spokane area; in 1896 walked across America from Spokane to New York City
 James Geraghty, Spokane City Corporate Counsel
 Alice Houghton, broker
 Henry John Kaiser, American industrialist

Native Americans
 Chief Garry, one of the Spokane tribes' most prominent and influential leaders during the shift from indigenous to European-American control of their land

Military
 John Babcock, last Canadian veteran of World War I
 Col. David P. Jenkins, Civil War Colonel, Spokane homesteader, and philanthropist

Crime
 Keith Hunter Jesperson, serial killer
 Robert Lee Yates, serial killer

References

 
Spokane